Saint-Aulaire is a railway station in Saint-Aulaire, Corrèze, Nouvelle-Aquitaine, France. The station is located on the Nexon - Brive railway line. The station is served by TER (local) services operated by SNCF. The station was also on the Thiviers - Saint-Aulaire railway line, which was open between 1898 and 1986.

Train services
The following services currently call at Saint-Aulaire:
local service (TER Nouvelle-Aquitaine) Limoges - Saint-Yrieix - Brive-la-Gaillarde

References

Railway stations in Corrèze